The Whole Truth is an American legal drama series that ran on ABC from September 22, 2010, to December 1, 2010. Episodes aired on Wednesdays at 10:00 pm ET/9:00 pm CT.  The show, which starred Rob Morrow and Maura Tierney, chronicled legal cases from the points of view of both the prosecution and the defense; it was set in New York City and shot in Los Angeles.

ABC canceled The Whole Truth, in October after four episodes had aired. Initially it planned to air the remaining episodes. Two months later, the network pulled the show from its schedule with seven episodes unaired. The unaired episodes later aired on the Nine Network in Australia and in the Netherlands on NET 5 in 2012.

Cast and characters

Main cast 
 Rob Morrow as Jimmy Brogan
 Maura Tierney as Kathryn Peale
 Eamonn Walker as Sr. ADA Terrence "Edge" Edgecomb
 Sean Wing as Chad Griffin
 Anthony Ruivivar as Alejo Salazar
 Christine Adams as Lena Boudreaux

Guest cast 
 Stephanie Lemelin as Rhonda (13 episodes)
 Jack McGee as Stan Klotz (2 episodes)
 John Aylward as Judge Jeremiah Studley (2 episodes)
 Christine Healy as Judge Anna Mae Harmon (2 episodes)
 Allison Smith as Corinne Sellards (1 episode)
 J. Kenneth Campbell as Larry Combs (1 episode)
 Skyler Day as Brianna Sellards (1 episode)
 Paul Greene as Kevin (1 episode)
 Shane Coffey as John Sellards (1 episode)
 Grey Damon as Todd Engler (1 episode)

Production
When ABC announced its 2010 fall schedule in May 2010, The Whole Truth was set to star Morrow and Joely Richardson in the two lead roles. Richardson filmed the original pilot  After the show was picked up, Richardson dropped out for personal reasons and was replaced by Maura Tierney, who went on to re-film all the Katie Peale scenes from the pilot. Tierney took on the role in addition to her recurring role on Rescue Me.

On-location production began in August: the show, set in New York City, was shot in Los Angeles, with Los Angeles City Hall, for example, standing in for the New York City Criminal Court.

Episodes

Reception
Before the show's premiere, Matthew Gilbert of The Boston Globe said, "Having seen the original Richardson pilot, which was re-filmed to add in Tierney, I can tell you that Tierney saves the show from near worthlessness. She brings a passion, a finely gauged sense of humor, and a strong chemistry with costar Rob Morrow that were missing before." In general, though, the show has received mixed reviews, with Metacritic assigning it a score of 57.

According to Joe Flint of the Los Angeles Times, the "solid" ratings of the second-season premiere of Modern Family and "disappointing numbers" for the second-season premiere of Cougar Town were followed by "just 4.9 million" viewers for The Whole Truth. In comparison, the legal comedy-drama The Defenders, in the same time slot as The Whole Truth, was the "highest-rated new show for the night, with 12.1 million viewers."

References

External links
 
 

2010s American drama television series
2010 American television series debuts
2010 American television series endings
American Broadcasting Company original programming
2010s American legal television series
English-language television shows
Television series by Warner Bros. Television Studios
Television shows set in New York City
Television series about prosecutors